Brendon Barrie McCullum  (born 27 September 1981) is a former cricketer and the current head coach of the England Cricket Test team. Representing New Zealand, he played all formats, including as captain. McCullum was renowned for his quick scoring, notably recording the fastest test century of all time. He is considered one of the most successful batsmen and captains of New Zealand cricket. He retired from all forms of cricket in August 2019.

McCullum is the former leading run scorer in Twenty20 International (T20I) cricket and is the first and so far only one of the two Kiwi players to have scored two T20I centuries and 2000 runs in T20I (apart from Martin Guptill). He became the first New Zealander to score a triple hundred in a Test, 302 runs against India on 18 February 2014. In 2014, he also became the first New Zealander to score 1000 test runs in a calendar year (1164). The record was bettered by Kane Williamson with 1172 runs in 2015. In his last Test outing on 20 February 2016, McCullum posted the fastest ever Test century, in 54 balls, beating the 56-ball record held by his hero, Vivian Richards, scoring a total of 145 off 79 balls. He also holds the record for the fastest 150 in Test cricket.

McCullum was the first batsman to score 2 tons in T20I. He was the previous record holder for the highest individual score in a Twenty20 International (123 against Bangladesh in 2012) and third highest individual score in all Twenty20 cricket (158 not out for the Kolkata Knight Riders against the Royal Challengers Bangalore in 2008) which was later surpassed by Aaron Finch (172 against Zimbabwe for Australia) and Chris Gayle (175 against the Pune Warriors India) for the Royal Challengers Bangalore in 2013 edition of IPL. He played for the Kolkata Knight Riders from 2008 to 2010 and again from 2012 to 2013, while in between he played for the Kochi Tuskers Kerala. He played the 2014 and 2015 seasons for the Chennai Super Kings. McCullum was a wicket-keeper until 2013.

On 22 December 2015, McCullum announced he would retire from international cricket at the end of the southern summer, joining his brother who had earlier that year announced his retirement from all forms of cricket. He is also the highest (170) runs scorer by the captain in his farewell test and first captain to score a century in his farewell test. He retired from all international cricket on 24 February 2016.

Both McCullum and his brother Nathan McCullum played domestically for Otago at provincial level. Their father Stuart McCullum also played for the side at first-class level. Brendon McCullum also played for franchise sides in a wide range of Twenty20 competitions around the world.

Domestic career
On 3 March 2008, before facing England for the test series, McCullum was involved in the State Shield Final versus the Auckland Aces, scoring 170 runs for the Otago Volts to help beat the Aces at Eden Park's outer oval, and helped to chase down a daunting total of 7 for 310, he broke multiple State Shield batting records. He scored the fastest LA hundred off 52 balls, including 14 fours and 5 sixes. With 170 runs in the match, McCullum scored the highest score by any player in a domestic one-day match (Shell or State competitions) overtaking Blair Hartland's previous record.

McCullum played for Glamorgan in 2006 and he scored 160 opening the batting against Leicestershire in the County Championship. On 24 January 2009, he lined up for New South Wales in the final of Australia's KFC Twenty20 Big Bash. This was an exercise to allow him to be eligible to play for them in the Twenty20 Champions League. This sparked criticism however despite opinion States are permitted to have one overseas player in their squad. McCullum also donated his match fee from the game to Otago Junior Cricket.

On 16 January 2010 during the 2009-10 HRV Cup, vs Auckland Aces at University Oval, McCullum hit 108 not out off 67 deliveries, which included 10 fours and four sixes to lead Otago Volts to victory with three balls to spare. 
McCullum reached his 50 off 32 deliveries and his century off 65 deliveries.

While playing for Warwickshire in the 2015 T20 Blast McCullum hit what was at the time the highest score in England's domestic T20 cup, 158* from just 64 balls. The innings remains the highest T20 score by a batsman at Edgbaston. Following his announcement to retire from international cricket in 2015, he signed with Middlesex for the 2016 NatWest T20 Blast, a blow for Warwickshire who had hoped he would return to them

In September 2016 he signed with the Lahore Qalandars for the 2017 season of the Pakistan Super League and will be the team's captain.

In the inaugural Indian Premier League tournament in 2008 he played for Kolkata Knight Riders. On 18 April 2008 in the first-ever IPL match, he achieved the highest Twenty20 individual score in an innings, 158* against RCB. This eclipsed the previous record mark of 141, held by Australian Cameron White. Coincidentally, McCullum faced an over from White during the match and scored 24 from it; it was White's only over in that match. This record was eventually broken by Chris Gayle when he piled on 175 runs in IPL 2013. In the same match he also claimed the record for most sixes (13) in a Twenty20 innings, which was later surpassed by Englishman Graham Napier (16).

He was bought by Kochi Tuskers Kerala in the 2011 IPL auctions. He returned to the Knight Riders in 2012. In the 2014 IPL auctions, McCullum was bought by Chennai Super Kings. He was given the role of opening the innings along with West Indian Dwayne Smith and the pair was considered the most dangerous opening pair in the league's history. In 2018 he was released by CSK and bought by Royal Challengers Bangalore in 2018.

During the RCB's season opener against Kolkata Knight Riders during the 2018 IPL season, he reached 9000 runs in all forms of T20 cricket and became only the second player after Chris Gayle to achieve the milestone.

International career

Early days
In 2004, he played in a Test series against England and scored what was then his highest score, an innings of 96 at Lord's. His maiden Test century came several months later when he scored 143 against Bangladesh. He fell just short of his second Test hundred in a game against Sri Lanka when dismissed one short of his hundred. His second century would later come with a run a ball 111 against Zimbabwe.

He was selected in the 20-man ICC World XI squad for the ICC Super Series in July 2005. On 20 February 2007, he scored 86 not out as New Zealand went on to be the first team to whitewash Australia in a three-match ODI series since 1997. During the innings he partnered with Craig McMillan to score 165, equalling the world record for a 6th wicket partnership.

On 31 December 2007, he scored 50 from just 19 balls against Bangladesh. He finished his innings with 80 runs from only 28 balls, including 9 fours and 6 sixes with a strike rate of 285.71.

Record breaking

On 1 July 2008, McCullum scored his maiden ODI century, a 135-ball 166, against Ireland in the Associates Tri-Series in Scotland. His century, along with James Marshall's 161, (his maiden ODI century in his last appearance, in which he shared in a 266 opening stand with McCullum which is the highest ODI partnership for any wicket in Black Caps history and the second highest opening partnership in all ODIs.) and Ross Taylor's 59, elevated New Zealand to 402, the highest and their only 400+ score for their team until date, and they won by 290 runs, setting a world record for the biggest margin of victory by runs, a record that stood until 2023.

On 5 April 2009, on day three of the third Test match during India's tour of New Zealand, he displayed an amazing level of alertness in the dismissal of Rahul Dravid. Dravid attempted a sweep shot off Daniel Vettori's bowling, but McCullum saw what Dravid was up to before the ball had even pitched and moved swiftly to his left (Dravid's leg side). Ross Taylor at first slip did the same. The ball came nicely off Dravid's bat, but flew straight into the hands of a waiting Brendon McCullum. A couple of balls earlier, McCullum tried the same thing, but he had been a little slow and Dravid's sweep was kept low. Although there has been some discussion regarding the legality of McCullum's movement before the ball had even pitched, the laws of cricket indicate he was well within his right to do so.

On 6 November 2009, against Pakistan at Abu Dhabi, McCullum scored his second ODI century of 131 to elevate New Zealand to 303 and win the match to level the series. On 16 February 2010, during the only Test match against Bangladesh, he scored 185, which is the highest score ever by a New Zealand wicket-keeper in Test cricket. He was also involved in the record highest sixth-wicket partnership for New Zealand of 339 runs with Martin Guptill, missing out on the world record by just 12 runs.

On 27 February 2010, McCullum became the second player to score a T20I hundred, finishing 116 not out, one run short of Chris Gayle's record of 117. On 4 May 2010 McCullum became the first player to score 1,000 T20 international runs. He achieved this feat playing against Zimbabwe in the 2010 ICC World Twenty20 at Guyana.

On 28 June 2010, McCullum announced that he would not keep wicket for New Zealand in Test matches. He, however, informed that he will still keep in 50-overs & T20 over games. He did a fine job in his first innings since handing over the wicketkeeping duties he scored 65 runs and was engaged in a 104 run partnership with Ross Taylor he was promoted to the position of opener in tests rather than his usual number 5 position. McCullum did however have experience of opening the innings because he opens for New Zealand in limited-overs cricket.

On 21 September 2012 at the 2012 ICC World Twenty20 tournament in Sri Lanka, McCullum scored 123 runs against Bangladesh at Pallekele, setting a new record for the highest Twenty20 International innings, and becoming the first player to score two Twenty20 International centuries. This record was broken by Aaron Finch against England, when he scored 156. However, McCullum is one of the two players to have scored two Twenty20 International centuries along with West Indian Chris Gayle.

He was awarded the T20 Player of the Year by NZC for the 2012–13 season.

Captaincy

In 2014 at the Basin Reserve in Wellington, McCullum scored 302 runs in the third innings of the second test against India, becoming the first New Zealand batsman to score a triple-century. He shared a 352 run partnership with BJ Watling, then a record sixth wicket stand, rescuing New Zealand from a likely innings defeat. McCullum closed the innings at 680/8d, both the highest ever innings by New Zealand, and the highest ever third innings in Test cricket history.

On 21 November 2014, McCullum took his first-ever wicket at test level, a caught-and-bowled of Pakistan's Sarfraz Ahmed during their second test. On 29 November 2014, McCullum scored a century on day 2 of the third test against the same opposition, in which both teams decided to call off play on the day before as a tribute to Phillip Hughes, and hand-written P.H. under each player's squad number as a further mark of respect.  He was bowled out on 202 after hitting eleven sixes in his innings, by far a record for New Zealand opening batsman.  Two years after his debut as NZ captain, in which the team was bowled out for a paltry 45, Black Caps returned to respectability.

On 13 December 2014, McCullum was named New Zealander of the Year by the New Zealand Herald beating out stiff competition from Lane Pilkington due to his continued co-operation with ICC over the match-fixing scandal which resulted in Chris Cairns being charged for lying to court, and also for changing the perception of the Black Caps as easy-beats.

On the first day of the Boxing Day Test at Hagley Oval, McCullum scored 195 in the first innings against Sri Lanka, which gave him 1000 test runs in a calendar year, becoming the first New Zealander to reach this milestone (1164 at the end of the match, with Kane Williamson at 929), and the fastest test century (in 74 balls), beating his own record against Pakistan in Sharjah. He fell 5 runs shy of his 4th 200+ scores in a calendar year. His 33 sixes in test cricket in a single calendar year is also a world record.  It is also worth noting that New Zealand only played 9 test matches in 2014.  He also helped to push New Zealand to score 429/7 on day one, the most runs New Zealand had ever scored in a single day of play in test cricket.  It ended with an 8-wicket win, which made it 5 test wins out of 9 in 2014, the most wins in a calendar year.  He also closed the year with a triple century and two double centuries, the third person to do so after Donald Bradman and Michael Clarke.

On 3 January 2015 McCullum returned to Basin Reserve, where he scored his triple century against India.  While he got a 2-ball duck on a green pitch and three errors as a fielder, he was given a key to Wellington, a symbolic equivalent of "Honorary Citizen", in recognition of his heroics the previous year, becoming the third person to receive the honour after Wellington-born Sir Peter Jackson and Sir Richard Taylor, who were recognised by the city for their work on the Lord of the Rings movies.

For his performances in the 2014–15 season, he won the Sir Richard Hadlee Medal.

Late career
McCullum also led New Zealand in the 2015 Cricket World Cup, which was co-hosted by New Zealand and Australia. On 20 February 2015, in New Zealand's third Pool A match against England, McCullum scored 77 runs off 25 balls, recording the fastest 50 in World Cup history (51 runs off 18 balls) and the 4th fastest fifty of all time. McCullum led the New Zealand team to their first World Cup final, scoring timely innings in the pool match against Australia and South Africa in the semi-final. The semi-final victory was New Zealand's first after six semi-final losses in the past. In the final against Australia, McCullum was bowled for a duck in just the first over of the match by Mitchell Starc, as New Zealand went on to lose to Australia by 7 wickets. Over the course of the tournament, McCullum was particularly aggressive in both batting as well as his captaincy, contributing to New Zealand reaching the finals. His aggressive starts against the strike bowlers of the opposition team such as James Anderson, Mitchell Johnson, and Dale Steyn favoured the rest of the players to play their natural game.

On 21 May 2015, McCullum started in his 93rd consecutive test, and batted in his preferred spot at no. 5. On 13 December 2015, on McCullum's 98th consecutive test start, he scored his 100th six hit in test cricket, tying the record by Adam Gilchrist. On 12 February 2016, McCullum started his 100th consecutive test, but was dismissed in both innings by Mitchell Marsh, making Marsh the second person since Jason Gillespie to dismiss him on both innings of 2 test matches.

On 22 December 2015, McCullum announced his intention to retire from international cricket at the end of the southern summer in his home test against Australia, rather than after the 2016 ICC World Twenty20. He played his last ODI match against Australia on 8 February 2016 in which he scored 47 off 27 and New Zealand beat Australia by 55 runs thereby winning the Chappell-Hadlee Trophy 2–1.

On 20 February 2016, in his final test in his adopted home of Christchurch, McCullum became the only member left from the last Trans-Tasman Test in Christchurch in the pre-earthquake AMI Stadium. The third day of the test was the 5th anniversary of the 2011 Christchurch earthquake. He hit his 102nd career six to surpass Adam Gilchrist as the most prolific six-hitter in test cricket. He went on to score a century off 54 balls, beating the joint record by West Indian Viv Richard and Pakistani Misbah-ul-Haq's record for the fastest test century by 2 balls. He also became the second player since Jason Gillespie to score a hundred or more in his final test. McCullum also recorded the highest (170) runs scorer by the captain in farewell test and 1st captain to score a ton in farewell test. He also took four catches as a fielder at first slip, deputising for the injured Ross Taylor.

On 22 February 2016, McCullum played his last innings in a Test Match against Australia. He scored 25 off 27, when he was dismissed by Josh Hazlewood one ball after hitting him for a 6. McCullum was given a guard of honour upon entry onto the field, and was given a standing ovation once dismissed. Brendon McCullum on his retirement said that the time was right to quit international cricket and said that he hopefully left and brought some fun and enjoyment and some real culture back into the set-up in the time that he had as captain.

In September 2018, he was named as the Icon Player for Kandahar's squad in the first edition of the Afghanistan Premier League tournament.

In July 2019, he was selected to play for the Glasgow Giants in the inaugural edition of the Euro T20 Slam cricket tournament. However, in August 2019 he retired from all forms of cricket.

Playing style
McCullum originally played in the side as a wicketkeeper-batsman.  His glove work improved during his tenure as the New Zealand wicketkeeper. His batting is good enough to earn him selection for the Black Caps alone, shown by the occasions on which he has been unable to keep but has still been selected as a batsman. He opens the batting for New Zealand in ODIs with steadily improving success. He is an aggressive batsman who is particularly strong over extra cover, often lofting the ball into the stands, and also square-cutting, or square-driving the ball.  He is also adept at using the scoop shot, even using it at tests, so much so that McScoop was named after him.  In 2010 McCullum hung up the gloves In Test cricket due to continued body strain and became a specialist batsmen in Test cricket, opening the innings in his first match as a specialist batsmen against India in Ahmedabad. He was described as a player "especially suited to Twenty20 cricket" when he signed for a five-week stint at Glamorgan in June 2006. The stint included the entire domestic 2006 Twenty20 Cup. He was signed up by the Kolkata Knight Riders of the IPL for $700,000. His contract with the IPL was for three years. In 2016, he was signed by the replacement/expansion team Gujarat Lions for US$1.1 million, making him the highest paid overseas player in the team's foundation squad.

He has the ability to play the Dilscoop (which was invented by Sri Lankan Tillakaratne Dilshan) or precisely the ramp shot, which involves the batsman squatting down and scooping deliveries back over the wicketkeeper's area. The two shots have their own distinction, where Dilscoop is played right above the wicket-keeper's head, but ramp shot can be played in sideways of the wicket-keeper as well. Playing this ramp shot in a Twenty20 International match on 28 February 2010 in Lancaster Park, against Australia, he managed to hit Shaun Tait for two sixes in an over back over Brad Haddin's head, forcing Australia to set a back stop (the fielder near the boundary behind the wicketkeeper or first slip) in his final test match.  He can also execute reverse sweep well. He also likes to cut, cover drive, or advance the wicket to punch the ball up for boundaries from a batting stance standing on or outside leg stump.

During the Twenty20 World Championship in 2009, the wicketkeeping duties was given to Peter McGlashan.  He was seen practicing his medium bowling. McCullum had to decide whether to play for New South Wales, KKR, or Otago in the 1st edition of the Champions League Twenty20. Since KKR did not qualify, he had only to consider playing for either New South Wales or Otago; eventually he had decided to play for Otago alongside brother Nathan McCullum.

In 2012, BJ Watling became McCullum's replacement as wicketkeeper in Tests, but due to Luke Ronchi's struggles in ODIs, McCullum still remained as wicketkeeper in ODIs and T20s.  But by late 2013, McCullum's recurring back problems meant he can no longer perform wicketkeeping duties effectively, he gave up his gloves to Ronchi in ODIs and T20s, and McCullum became a middle order batsman, or as a cover for opening the batting in tests, having batted at 1,2,5–7 in his career, while his fielding position becomes predominantly mid-off, mid-on or mid-wicket, and in his final international matches, he ended at first slip after the injury to Ross Taylor.  He is also a very seldom-used part-time medium pace bowler in tests.  He got his first wicket in all forms of international cricket from a caught-and-bowled against Sarfraz Ahmed of Pakistan which ended their first innings in 2014. McCullum was picked for 2015 ICC Cricket World Cup as an opening batsman due to inconsistencies from Martin Guptill and Tom Latham and the emergence of Grant Elliott as a solid option at number five batsman. His role as a pinch hitter saw the team reach their first-ever World Cup final.  After the World Cup, he returned to his preferred spot at number five for tests. He still occasionally keeps wickets for domestic T20s until 2015.

International recognition
In the 2015 Queen's Birthday Honours McCullum was appointed an Officer of the New Zealand Order of Merit for services to cricket. He won the New Zealand Sportsman Of The Year award in 2014, and then the Sport New Zealand Leadership Award in 2016.

In June 2016, just a few months after his retirement from international cricket, McCullum was honoured with an invitation to deliver the prestigious MCC Spirit of Cricket Cowdrey Lecture. He became only the second New Zealand player ever to have been invited to deliver the Cowdrey lecture, the only other New Zealander being the late Martin Crowe.

Coaching career
He was appointed as head coach for both Trinbago Knight Riders and Kolkata Knight Riders in August 2019. Under his leadership, Trinbago Knight Riders won their 4th CPL title in 2020.

England
On 12 May 2022, he was appointed as a head coach of Test format for the England cricket team. His first assignment was a 3-Test home series against his home country New Zealand, which got off to a great start as England won the game at Lord's by 5 wickets. He then continued to coach the team to a second 5 wicket win at batting-friendly ground Trent Bridge. Joe Root's brilliant 176 in the first innings was characterized by McCullum's coaching, as well as the bowling in the second innings, with McCullum advising positions to Ben Stokes, England's captain. The series clean sweep was completed with a victory by 7 wickets in the 3rd Test at Headingley.

This was followed by a win against India at Edgbaston, where England chased down a national record 378 for the loss of only three wickets. The new attacking, positive intention approach, instigated by McCullum and captain Ben Stokes was labelled Bazball by Andrew Miller, the UK editor of ESPNcricinfo, after McCullum's Baz nickname. The phrase picked up increasing use across the wider media.

The South Africa cricket team toured England from July to September 2022 to play three Test matches, three One Day International (ODI) and three Twenty20 International (T20I) matches. England won the series win 2-1.

In winter 2022 during England's tour of Pakistan, he coached England to the first ever whitewash of Pakistan in a home series.

Beyond cricket
McCullum has since been involved in setting up CricHQ with the company's CEO Simon Baker and former New Zealand cricketer Stephen Fleming.  The cricket competition management software and live scoring platform manages the administration of cricket test countries New Zealand, Sri Lanka, South Africa and Zimbabwe with 49 of 105 national governing bodies also use its services from club level upwards. 20 other high-profile cricketing names have invested in the company. In June 2015 it raised US$10m from Singapore private equity firm Tembusu Partners to expand globally.

In May 2018, he briefly returned to rugby for a month, a game he hasn't played since starting over Dan Carter in high school before retiring, citing diminishing knowledge of the game, and rugby fitness.

See also
 List of Test cricket triple centuries
 List of centuries in Twenty20 International cricket

References

External links

 Brendon McCullum at New Zealand Cricket
Brendon McCullum at Brisbane Heat
 
 Brendon McCullum's Fastest 50 in ICC Cricket World Cup

|-

|-

|-

1981 births
Living people
Cricketers from Dunedin
People educated at King's High School, Dunedin
New Zealand Youth Test captains
New Zealand Youth One Day International captains
New Zealand Test cricket captains
New Zealand One Day International captains
New Zealand Twenty20 International captains
Cricketers at the 2003 Cricket World Cup
Cricketers at the 2007 Cricket World Cup
Cricketers at the 2011 Cricket World Cup
Cricketers at the 2015 Cricket World Cup
Brisbane Heat cricketers
Canterbury cricketers
Chennai Super Kings cricketers
Glamorgan cricketers
Gujarat Lions cricketers
Kandahar Knights cricketers
Kolkata Knight Riders cricketers
Kochi Tuskers Kerala cricketers
Lahore Qalandars cricketers
Marylebone Cricket Club cricketers
Middlesex cricketers
New South Wales cricketers
Otago cricketers
Rangpur Riders cricketers
Royal Challengers Bangalore cricketers
South Island cricketers
Sussex cricketers
Trinbago Knight Riders cricketers
Warwickshire cricketers
New Zealand cricket coaches
New Zealand cricket commentators
Officers of the New Zealand Order of Merit
Wicket-keepers
Coaches of the England cricket team